Saraj Mahalleh or Seraj Mahalleh may refer to:
 Saraj Mahalleh, Amol
 Saraj Mahalleh, Galugah
 Seraj Mahalleh, Juybar